Laughter is an audible expression of merriment or amusement.

Laughter may also refer to:

 Laughter (Ian Dury & The Blockheads album)
 Laughter (The Mighty Lemon Drops album)
 "Laughter", a 1994 song by James from the album Wah Wah
 Laughter (1930 film), a 1930 film starring Fredric March
 Laughter (2020 film), a Canadian film directed by Martin Laroche
 Laughter (book), a 1900 collection of three essays by Henri Bergson
Laughter (novel), an Arabic novel by Ghalib Halasa
Laughter EP, a 2017 release by Tiny Vipers

See also
 
 Laughter yoga, a technique that uses laughter exercises
 Laughter in literature
 Laughter Chilembe (born 1975), Zambian footballer
 Laugh (disambiguation) and Laughing (disambiguation)
 Giggle (disambiguation) and Snickers (disambiguation)
 Chuckles (disambiguation)
 Sylvia Laughter, American politician